SV VELO (short for Sportvereniging Verdedig en Loop Op) is an omnisports club from Wateringen, Netherlands. It has branches for handball, badminton, volleyball, football, checkers, boules, road cycling, and martial arts. The first squad football plays in the Eerste Klasse. The badminton division is a leading badminton club in Europe.

History 

SV VELO was founded on 14 July 1930 as a football club. In 1949, the handball branch was added. In 1960, martial arts was started, in 1966 badminton, in 1972 volleyball, and in 1974 road cycling. In 1991, a boules branch was founded. In 2014, VELO badminton became for the tenth time national champions in badminton.

Notable players 

 Mia Audina – badminton
 Rachel van Cutsen – badminton
 Jeroen van Dijk – badminton
 Astrid van der Knaap – badminton
 Rune Massing – badminton
 Jim Middelburg – badminton
 Dicky Palyama – badminton
 Alex Vlaar – badminton
 Robert Zwinkels – goalkeeper ADO Den Haag

References

Externe link 
 Official website

Sports clubs in the Netherlands
Sports clubs in South Holland
1930 establishments in the Netherlands
Football clubs in the Netherlands
Football clubs in South Holland
Badminton clubs
Martial arts in the Netherlands
Cycling clubs
Dutch handball clubs
Dutch volleyball clubs
Sport in Westland (municipality), Netherlands
Badminton in the Netherlands